Fulvoclysia arguta is a species of moth of the family Tortricidae. It is found in Syria and Asia Minor.

References

Moths described in 1968
Cochylini